Kevin Geoffrey Rice (born 13 January 1965) is a former English cricketer.  Rice was a right-handed batsman who bowled right-arm off break.  He was born in Morchard Bishop, Devon.

Rice made his debut for Devon in the 1984 Minor Counties Championship against Cornwall.  From 1984 to 1998, he represented the county in 47 Championship matches, the last of which came against Cheshire.  He made his MCCA Knockout Trophy debut for the county in 1985 against Wiltshire.  From 1985 to 1991, he represented the county in 13 Trophy matches, the last of which came against Dorset.  Ward also played List A cricket for Devon at a time when they were permitted to take part in the domestic one-day competition, making his debut in that format against Warwickshire in the 1985 NatWest Trophy.  He played 5 further List A matches between 1985 and 1991, the last of which came against Essex in the 1991 NatWest Trophy.  In his 6 List A matches, he scored 167 runs at a batting average of 27.83, with a single century high score of 107 which came on his List A debut.

He also played Second XI cricket for the Gloucestershire Second XI (1981–1983) and the Somerset Second XI (1984).

References

External links
Kevin Rice at ESPNcricinfo
Kevin Rice at CricketArchive

1965 births
Living people
People from Mid Devon District
Cricketers from Devon
English cricketers
Devon cricketers